Maximiliano Silerio Esparza is a Mexican politician, member of Institutional Revolutionary Party and a former Governor of Durango (1992–1998).

Biography
Maximiliano Silerio has occupied the positions of Federal Deputy on II the Federal Electoral District of Durango in the L Legislature from 1976 to 1979, elected as Senator representing Durango for the period from 1988 to 1994, resigned the position in 1992 to accept the nomination as candidate of the PRI for Governor for period of 1992 to 1998.

During his period as governor, he maintained a bordering conflict with the state of Zacatecas because of a land claim on the part of Tepehuanos natives.

In addition he has carried out numerous positions like Delegate of his party in various states of the republic.

References

See also
Governor of Durango

Living people
Members of the Chamber of Deputies (Mexico) for Durango
Presidents of the Chamber of Deputies (Mexico)
Members of the Senate of the Republic (Mexico) for Durango
Presidents of the Senate of the Republic (Mexico)
Governors of Durango
Institutional Revolutionary Party politicians
Politicians from Durango
Year of birth missing (living people)
20th-century Mexican politicians
Deputies of the L Legislature of Mexico